Eulamprotes occidentella is a moth of the family Gelechiidae. It was described by Peter Huemer and Ole Karsholt in 2011. It is found in the south-western Alps of France and Italy (Cottian Alps).

References

Moths described in 2011
Eulamprotes